De Vries is a lunar impact crater on the far side of the Moon relative to the Earth. It lies about midway between the craters Racah to the north-northwest and Orlov to the south-southeast. An nameless walled plain lies between De Vries and Orlov, with the perimeter of this feature joining the two rims.

This crater is not significantly eroded, although a small crater is attached to the exterior of the northern rim. Within the somewhat interior floor is a broad central rise offset just to the northeast of the midpoint.

Satellite craters
By convention these features are identified on lunar maps by placing the letter on the side of the crater midpoint that is closest to De Vries.

References

 
 
 
 
 
 
 
 
 
 
 
 

Impact craters on the Moon